Hippocoronium or Hippokoronion was a town of ancient Crete.

The site of Hippocoronium is unlocated; however, the mountain of the same name is tentatively identified with modern Mt. Drapanokephala.

References

Populated places in ancient Crete
Former populated places in Greece
Lost ancient cities and towns